The 1998 K League Championship was the fifth competition of the K League Championship, and was held to decide the 16th champions of the K League. It was contested between the top four clubs of the regular season. The first round was played as a single match between third place and fourth place of the regular season. The winners of the first round advanced to the semi-final, and played against runners-up of the regular season over two legs. The final progressed in the same way as the semi-final, and winners of the regular season qualified directly.

Qualified teams

Bracket

First round

Semi-final

First leg

Second leg

4–4 on aggregate. Ulsan Hyundai Horang-i won 4–1 on penalties.

Final

First leg

Second leg

Suwon Samsung Bluewings won 1–0 on aggregate.

Final table

See also
1998 K League

External links
News at K League 
Match report at K League 
RSSSF

 

K League Championship
K